The Viceroy of Rivers and Waterways in Jiangnan Overseeing Military Affairs, better known simply as the Viceroy of Southern Rivers or Viceroy of Southern Rivers and Waterways, was a government office in China proper during the Qing dynasty. The office was based in Qingjiangpu (清江浦), which is now a district of Huai'an City, Jiangsu Province. The Viceroy usually held the rank of a deputy first-grade official or a regular second-grade official. The Viceroy was in charge of dredging and embankment projects in the waterways of Jiangsu Province.

History
The office of Viceroy of Rivers and Waterways was created in the early Qing dynasty. In 1677, during the reign of the Kangxi Emperor, Jin Fu   Jìn Fǔ, 16331692) served as the Viceroy of Rivers and Waterways and his headquarters were in Jining, Shandong Province. As Huai'an, Jiangsu Province was near the intersection of the Yellow River, Huai River and Grand Canal, the waterworks in that area became of prime importance. Since the Viceroy's office was too far away from Huai'an, the Qing government created a separate branch for the Viceroy's office at the northwest of Qingjiangpu (清江浦; a district of present-day Huai'an, Jiangsu Province) to facilitate the Viceroy's job of overseeing the waterworks.

In 1729, the Yongzheng Emperor split the Viceroy of Rivers and Waterways into the Viceroy of Southern Rivers based in Qingjiangpu, and the Viceroy of Eastern Rivers based in Jining. In the following year, he created the Viceroy of Northern Rivers, which was then concurrently held by the Viceroy of Zhili. The Viceroy of Southern Rivers oversaw a total of four circuits, 24 subprefectures and 24 battalions of military forces.

In the early Qing dynasty, the central government provided an annual amount of 4.5 million silver taels to the Viceroy of Southern Rivers for construction and maintenance projects. When the rivers overflowed, the central government provided additional funds to the Viceroy. At the same time, numerous instances of corruption occurred when the Viceroy and his subordinates embezzled the funds and produced work of substandard quality. The area around Qingjiangpu developed rapidly and became a thriving centre of commerce, business and recreation, with dozens of streets filled with rows of shops, restaurants, teahouses, bathhouses and brothels.

In 1855, the Xianfeng Emperor ordered the Yellow River to be redirected northward from Lanyi County, Henan Province towards Changyuan County, Dongming County and Zhangqiu Town in Shandong Province, and then from the Ji River in Shandong Province towards the Bohai Sea.

In 1860, the Nian rebels attacked and captured Qingjiangpu from government forces and then burnt down the Viceroy's office and the surrounding areas. The Qing government abolished the Viceroy of Southern Rivers in the following year.

As of today, the garden of the Viceroy's office has been restored and is now known as Qing Yan Garden.

List of Viceroys of Southern Rivers

References 
 

 

 
1729 establishments in China